Hyun Ki Young is a South Korean author from Jeju, specializing in the modern history of Jeju island.

Life
Hyun Ki-Young was born on Jeju Island in 1941 and graduated from Seoul National University. He has served as the Managing Director of the National Literary Writers Association (2000–2001) and as the President of the Korean Arts & Culture Foundation (2003). Hyun was also the director of the Committee for the Investigation of the 3 April Jeju Uprising as well as the President of the Jeju Institute for the Investigation of Social Problems.

Work
Hyun is an expert on the history of Jeju Island in the modern era, particularly the April Massacre of 1948 in which islanders were killed en masse by the Korean police in the latter's attempt to exterminate communist sympathizers. The event is the subject of much of his writing. Hyun began his writing career in 1975 with "Father" (Abeoji), published in The Dong-a Ilbo, and strove to depict the psychological trauma experienced by Jeju islanders.

Hyun is best known in the English-speaking world for his story "Aunt Suni", which was released in English in 2010 and panned for its poor translations.  The story has since been re-translated as "Sun-I Samch'on" in a bilingual (English and Korean) volume. The story was the first published writing in South Korea about the Jeju massacre, and shortly after its release in 1978, Hyun was arrested and tortured for three days by the South Korean authorities. The government claimed his arrest was due to his presence at an anti-government protest, but upon release he was warned against ever writing about the massacre again, which revealed the government's true motives behind his arrest.

Recognition
Hyun is extremely well known in South Korea having won a number of literary prizes, including the 5th Sin Dong-yeop Prize For Literature in 1986, the Manhae Prize in 1990, the Oh Yeong-su Literary Prize in 1994, and the 1999 Hankook Ilbo Literature Prize.

Works in Korean (partial) 
 A Bird Crying in the Periphery (1983)
 Windy Island (1989)
 The Last Horse Herder (1994)
 One Spoon on This Earth (1999)

Translated works 
 Uncle Suni, (1979) Gakbook, 2008 .
 Dead Silence. Stories on the Jeju Massacre, EastBridge Signature Books, 2007 .
 Sun-i Samch’on Asia Publishers, 2012 .
 One Spoon on This Earth, Dalkey Archive Press, 2013 .

References

External links
 Review of Aunt Suni

1941 births
Living people
South Korean novelists
Seoul National University alumni
People from Jeju Province